The 2003 NCAA Division I men's ice hockey tournament involved 16 schools playing in single-elimination play to determine the national champion of men's  NCAA Division I college ice hockey. The tournament began on March 28, 2003, and ended with the championship game on April 12. A total of 15 games were played.  2003 was the first year 16 teams were invited to the tournament and was the first expansion of the tournament since 1988 when it increased from eight to 12 teams.  The first and second rounds of the 2003 tournament were divided across four regional sites, an increase from the two regional format in place since 1992.

Minnesota became the first team to successfully defend their title since Boston University won back-to-back titles in 1971 and 1972.

Game locations

The NCAA Men's Division I Ice Hockey Championship is a single-elimination tournament featuring 16 teams representing all six Division I conferences in the nation.  The Championship Committee seeds the entire field from 1 to 16 within four regionals of 4 teams. The winners of the six Division I conference championships receive automatic bids to participate in the NCAA Championship. Regional placements are based primarily on the home location of the top seed in each bracket with an attempt made to put the top-ranked teams close to their home site.

First round and regional finals
 East – Dunkin' Donuts Center, Providence, Rhode Island
 Midwest – Yost Ice Arena, Ann Arbor, Michigan
 Northeast – Centrum Centre, Worcester, Massachusetts
 West – Mariucci Arena, Minneapolis, Minnesota

Frozen Four
 HSBC Arena, Buffalo, New York

Qualifying teams
The at-large bids and seeding for each team in the tournament was announced on March 23, 2003. The Western Collegiate Hockey Association (WCHA) had five teams receive a berth in the tournament, Hockey East had four teams receive a berth in the tournament, the Central Collegiate Hockey Association (CCHA) had three teams receive a berth in the tournament, the ECAC had two berths, while both the Metro Atlantic Athletic Conference (MAAC) and College Hockey America (CHA) received one bid for their tournament champions.

Number in parentheses denotes overall seed in the tournament.

Tournament bracket

Note: * denotes overtime period(s)

Regional semifinals

East Regional

(1) Cornell vs. (4) Minnesota State-Mankato

(2) Boston College vs. (3) Ohio State

Midwest Regional

(1) Colorado College vs. (4) Wayne State

(2) Maine vs. (3) Michigan

Northeast Regional

(1) New Hampshire vs. (4) St. Cloud State

(2) Boston University vs. (3) Harvard

West Regional

(1) Minnesota vs. (4) Mercyhurst

(2) Ferris State vs. (3) North Dakota

Regional Finals

East Regional

(1) Cornell vs. (2) Boston College

Midwest Regional

(1) Colorado College vs. (3) Michigan

Northeast Regional

(1) New Hampshire vs. (2) Boston University

West Regional

(1) Minnesota vs. (2) Ferris State

Frozen Four

National semifinal

(E1) Cornell vs. (NE1) New Hampshire

(W1) Minnesota vs. (MW3) Michigan

National Championship

(W1) Minnesota vs. (NE1) New Hampshire

All-Tournament team
G: Travis Weber (Minnesota)
D: Paul Martin (Minnesota)
D: Matt DeMarchi (Minnesota)
F: Steve Saviano (New Hampshire)
F: Thomas Vanek* (Minnesota)
F: Nathan Martz (New Hampshire)
* Most Outstanding Player(s)

Record by conference

References

Tournament
NCAA Division I men's ice hockey tournament
NCAA Men's Division Ice Hockey Tournament
NCAA Men's Division Ice Hockey Tournament
NCAA Men's Division Ice Hockey Tournament
NCAA Men's Division Ice Hockey Tournament
NCAA Men's Division Ice Hockey Tournament
NCAA Men's Division Ice Hockey Tournament
NCAA Men's Division Ice Hockey Tournament
2000s in Minneapolis
21st century in Buffalo, New York
Ice hockey in Michigan
Ice hockey competitions in New York (state)
Sports competitions in Buffalo, New York
Ice hockey competitions in Michigan
Ice hockey competitions in Minneapolis
Sports in Ann Arbor, Michigan
Ice hockey competitions in Providence, Rhode Island
Ice hockey competitions in Worcester, Massachusetts